Maskavas Forštate also known as Maskavas priekšpilsēta and colloquially as Maskačka, is a suburb of Riga situated on the right bank of the Daugava. The neighborhood is located to the south of Old Riga along the road historically connecting Riga to Moscow, from which its name is derived.

History

The history of Maskavas Forštate, whose name in English literally means Moscow Suburb goes back to at least the 14th century, in some parts the medieval street network has been preserved. However, the area is first mentioned in 1348 by the name of Lastādija.

Architecturally, the neighborhood reflects its history as an area of Russian, Belarusian and Jewish migration, especially characteristic wooden homes.

During the Nazi occupation of Riga, the neighborhood was turned into a ghetto for Jews. Today, there are memorials on the site of the Great Choral Synagogue and the Old Jewish cemetery. Most of the prewar buildings remain standing.

Demographics
In the 1980s and 1990s the area developed a reputation for drug abuse and criminal activity. New buildings, offices, shops and the migration of local families have changed the district's economic profile in the 21st century.

By 2008, Maskavas Forštate had an average level of criminality along with the Centre and Old Riga. The Ministry of the Interior of Latvia divided Riga into 9 districts with the following levels of criminality:

 2 - High (more than 2900 criminal offences): Located in the periphery of Riga.
 4 - Average (between 2100 and 2700 criminal offences): Centre, Old Riga, Maskavas Forštate.
 3 - Low (less than 1700 criminal offences): Purvciems, Mežaparks (One of the wealthier areas of Riga).

Based on the number of criminal offences against foreigners, Maskavas Forštate was the 3rd safest district in Riga according to the statistics.

Architecture

The area has a notable legacy of diverse religious buildings, reflecting its history as a destination for numerous migrants.
The Lutheran Jesus Church is the biggest wooden classical building in Latvia.
Grebenstchikov Old Believer house of prayer is the largest in the world.

The Central market is located next to the railway station in a series of former Zeppelin hangars.

Protected Heritage status for older wooden houses has prevented their demolition, and a process of gentrification is underway.

Higher Education

Lomonosova Street (lv) is the location of a cluster of higher education institutions.
Baltic International Academy
Transport and Telecommunication Institute
ISMA University
College of Economics and Culture (lv)

The building of the Latvian Academy of Sciences is located on Akadēmijas Square. Nearby is the Riga Building College.

The Latvian Academy of Culture (lv) is on Ludzas Street (lv).

Transport

The suburb is defined by the Riga–Daugavpils Railway which borders it on the north and east along with marshaling yards. If the Rail Baltica project is competed as planned in Riga, part of the railway embankment separating the suburb from the city centre will be replaced by an overpass bridge, greatly restoring access to the suburb.

Central and Vagonu Parks stations are accessible from the area. Rigas Satiksme operates a tramline down Maskavas street and bus services throughout.

In popular culture
Some scenes in the television adaptation of the Robert Harris novel Archangel, starring Daniel Craig, were filmed on Maskavas Iela and Katolu Iela.

The 1995 adaption of The Dogs of Riga featured scenes set at Riga Central Market. In the 2012 adaptation, featuring Kenneth Branagh, the main character visits Latgale market on Firsa Sadovņikova street.

Gallery

References

External links

Riga historical encyclopaedia
Latgale suburb area history in Latvian
The Virtual Jewish History Tour History of the Riga ghetto

Video
Astro'n'out "Daļa Rīgas"

Neighbourhoods in Riga
Russians in Latvia
Holocaust locations in Latvia